The Night Watchman's Wife (Swedish: Nattvaktens hustru) is a 1947 Swedish drama film directed by Bengt Palm and starring Åke Grönberg, Britta Holmberg and Sture Lagerwall. It was shot at the Centrumateljéerna Studios in Stockholm and on location around the city. The film's sets were designed by the art director Bertil Duroj.

Synopsis
Ingegerd arrives in Stockholm from the countryside to live with her sister. She encounters the charming Curt at Stockholm Central Station but then loses touch with him. Finding that her sister has died, and she has nowhere to go, she wanders the streets. She is eventually taken in by a kindly nightwatchmen, and they marry soon afterwards. Sometime later, however, she accidentally runs into Curt again who tries to charm her away. However, she ultimately stays loyal to her husband.

Cast
 Åke Grönberg as 	Gunnar Eklund
 Britta Holmberg as 	Ingegerd Lindberg
 Sture Lagerwall as 	Curt Brehmer
 Thor Modéen as 	Sausage salesman
 Douglas Håge as 	Cafe-keeper
 Åke Claesson as 	Baron
 Naima Wifstrand as 	Mrs. Eklund
 Allan Bohlin as Policeman
 Hugo Björne as Göransson
 Linnéa Hillberg as Mrs. Lindberg
 Astrid Bodin as Lindberg's Maid 
 Helga Brofeldt as 	Angry neighbor 
 Carla Eck as 	Nurse 
 Siv Ericks as 	Waitress
 Gösta Ericsson as 	Man in staircase
 Barbro Flodquist as 	Elna 
 Arne Källerud as 	Gunnar's friend at work 
 Mimi Nelson as Curt's friend
 Carl Reinholdz as Gunnar's colleague 
 Olav Riégo as Gentleman at company party 
 Viveca Serlachius as 	Waitress 
 Gunnar Sjöberg as 	Managing Director 
 Hans Strååt as Doctor 
 Carl Ström as 	Mr. Lindberg 
 Ivar Wahlgren as 	Constable 
 Torsten Winge as Fashion Director

References

Bibliography 
 Krawc, Alfred. International Directory of Cinematographers, Set- and Costume Designers in Film: Denmark, Finland, Norway, Sweden (from the beginnings to 1984). Saur, 1986.
 Qvist, Per Olov & von Bagh, Peter. Guide to the Cinema of Sweden and Finland. Greenwood Publishing Group, 2000.

External links 
 

1947 films
Swedish drama films
1947 drama films
1940s Swedish-language films
Films directed by Bengt Palm
Films set in Stockholm
Films shot in Stockholm
1940s Swedish films